The Dean of Dromore has responsibility for Dromore Cathedral in the Diocese of Down and Dromore in the Church of Ireland.

Deans of Dromore

1693/4 Isaac Plume
1609 William Todd
1621 Thomas Wilson
1622 John Wall
1623 Robert Dawson
1628/9 William Moore
1632/3–1638 George Synge (afterwards Bishop of Cloyne, 1638)
1638–1641 Robert Forward
1642–1673 Nicholas Greaves
1673–1681 William Smyth (afterwards Bishop of Killala and Achonry, 1681)
1681–1721 John Leslie
1721/2 Henry Leslie
1721/2 George Berkeley (afterwards Dean of Derry, 1724)
1724–1729 John Hamilton (son-in-law of Francis Hutchinson, Bishop of Down and Connor) 
1729–1759 Samuel Hutchinson (afterwards Bishop of Killala and Achonry, 1759)
1759–1772 Walter Cope (afterwards Bishop of Clonfert and Kilmacduagh, 1772)
1772–1772 Hon. Joseph Deane Bourke, 3rd Earl of Mayo (afterwards Bishop of Ferns and Leighlin, 1772)
1772–1808 Raphael Walsh
1809–1837 James Mahon
1841–1842 William Henry Wynne
1842–1850 Holt Waring
1851–1875 Daniel Bagot
1879–1885 Jeffry Lefroy
1885–1887 Henry Stewart
1887–1894 Theophilus Campbell
1894-1905 Abraham Dawson
1905–1925 Robert Stuart O'Loughlin
1925–1931 Thomas William Clarendon
1931–1932 Henry Biddall Swanzy
1945–1951 Edward Albert Myles
1951–1957 Wilfred R.M. Orr
1957–1961 William A. Jones
1961–1964 John William Appleby
1964–1965 Arthur Theodore Irving Forde
1965–1971 Henry Hughes
1971–1975 Hugh Hastings Richard Mayes
1975–1984 R.J. Norman Lockhart
1990-1992 Mervyn Robert Wilson
1993–1995 Roland Hutchinson
1995–2002 David Robert Chillingworth (afterwards Bishop of St Andrews, Dunkeld and Dunblane, 2005)
2002–2013 Stephen H. Lowry
2014–2015 Bryan T. Kerr (Resigned 30 November 2015)
2016–present Geoff Wilson

References

 
Diocese of Down and Dromore
Dean of Dromore